Bjarne Aas (28 February 1886 – 29 March 1969) was a Norwegian engineer, sailor, yacht designer and ship builder.

Biography
He was born in Kristiania (now Oslo), Norway. He was a son of Henrik Ernst Aas and Anette Sofie Sørensen. He studied ship construction at the Karljohansvern technical college  (Karljohansverns tekniske skole) in Horten. After graduation, he worked as a boat designer in Fredrikstad, later in Bergen and Tønsberg. In 1916, he founded Norsk Gearfabrikk AS on Isegran in Fredrikstad.

In total, he designed approx. 615 boats. His breakthrough as yacht designer came in 1924, when his Elisabeth V won a gold medal at the 1924 Summer Olympics. In 1932, Aas designed Biskop Hvoslef which was his first rescue boat.  Among his best known designs is the International One Design. He was decorated Knight, First Class of the Order of St. Olav in 1957.

References

1886 births
1969 deaths
Engineers from Oslo
20th-century Norwegian engineers
Norwegian sailors
Norwegian yacht designers